The Men's 25 metre centre fire pistol singles event at the 2010 Commonwealth Games took place on 10 October 2010, at the CRPF Campus.

Results

External links
Report

Shooting at the 2010 Commonwealth Games